Lucien Barbour (March 4, 1811 – July 19, 1880) was an American lawyer and politician who served one term as a U.S. Representative from Indiana from 1855 to 1857.

Biography 
Born in Canton, Connecticut, Barbour was graduated from Amherst College in 1837. He moved to Indiana the same year and settled in Madison, Jefferson County. He studied law. He was admitted to the bar and commenced practice in Indianapolis, Indiana, in 1839. Barbour acted a number of times as arbitrator between the State of Indiana and private corporations. He was appointed United States district attorney for the district of Indiana by President Polk. He served as member of the commission to codify the laws of Indiana in 1852.

Congress 
Barbour was elected as an Indiana People's Party candidate to the Thirty-fourth Congress (March 4, 1855 – March 3, 1857). He was not a candidate for renomination in 1856.

Later career and death 
He was affiliated with the Republican Party in 1860.
Barbour practiced law in Indianapolis, Indiana, until his death in that city on July 19, 1880. He was interred in Crown Hill Cemetery.

References

1811 births
1880 deaths
People from Canton, Connecticut
Politicians from Indianapolis
Indiana lawyers
Opposition Party members of the United States House of Representatives from Indiana
Indiana Republicans
Amherst College alumni
Burials at Crown Hill Cemetery
19th-century American politicians
United States Attorneys for the District of Indiana
19th-century American lawyers
Members of the United States House of Representatives from Indiana